Mission London is a 2010 comedy film directed by Dimitar Mitovski and starring Alan Ford, Lee Nicholas Harris and Ralph Brown.

Plot
A concert to celebrate Bulgaria joining the EU is planned at the Embassy in London. Varadin, the new ambassador, is given the role of ensuring that the Queen attends. However a combination of corrupt staff, criminal gangs operating out of the kitchen, falling in love with a stripper and a little misunderstanding with a PR firm that provides look-alike royalties - the basic job turns into a chaotic nightmare.

Cast
 Ralph Brown as Detective Collway
 Alan Ford as Sibling
 Nick Nevern as The Bodyguard
 Tomas Arana as Munroe
 Velizar Binev as Kamal
 Lee Nicholas Harris as Bodyguard
 Rosemary Leach as Miss Cunningham
 Georgi Staykov as Chavo
 Jonathan Ryland as Dale Rutherford
 Yulian Vergov as Varadin Dimitrov
 Atanas Srebrev as Narrator
 Malin Krastev as Racho
 Elizabeth Boag as News Reporter
 Johnny Lynch as Red Carpet Police Officer
 Sean Talo as Corps Diplomatique
 Meto Jovanovski as Macedonian ambassador
 Gino Picciano as Hospital Visitor
 Hristo Mitzkov as Expert
 J.D. Kelleher as Barry
 James Helder as News Crew Presenter
 Ana Papadopulu as	Katya
 Lyubomir Neikov as Kosta Banicharov
 Teodora Andreeva Andrea (Bulgarian singer) as Russian Hitwoman
 Carla Rahal as Dotty
 Ernestina Chinova as Devorina Selyanska
 Stephen Leddington as Detective Sergeant
 Dennis Santucci as Close Protection Escort
 Orlin Goranov as President
 Silvia Dragoeva as Lara Croft Look-Alike
 Koceto Kalki as Koce Paunov
 Deborah Klayman as Reporter
 Kiril Psaltirov as Moma Dimich
 Jeremy Bennett as Director of Hyde Park
 Pavel Chernev as Batkata

References

External links

2010 films
2010 action comedy films
Films shot in Bulgaria
Bulgarian comedy films